Patrick Alfred Bates (born July 26, 1969) is an American professional golfer who has played on the PGA Tour and who served as the head men's golf coach at the University of Central Oklahoma from 2011 to 2016.

Bates was born in St. Louis, Missouri. He accepted an athletic scholarship to attend the University of Florida in Gainesville, Florida, where he played for coach Buddy Alexander's Florida Gators men's golf team in National Collegiate Athletic Association (NCAA) competition from 1988 to 1991.  He received first-team All-Southeastern Conference (SEC) honors and was an All-American in 1989, 1990 and 1991.  Bates graduated from Florida with a bachelor's degree in communications process and disorders.

Bates played on the Nationwide Tour in 1994, from 1996 to 2001 and 2005 to 2007. He played on the PGA Tour in 1995 and from 2002 to 2004. His best finish in a PGA Tour event was a tie for fifth at the Bank of America Colonial in 2003.

In 2001 Bates won three events on the Nationwide Tour which gave him an immediate promotion to the PGA Tour.

His wife, Kristine Tewell, is the daughter of Champions Tour golfer Doug Tewell.

Professional wins (6)

Buy.com Tour wins (5)

Buy.com Tour playoff record (0–2)

Other wins (1)
1993 Massachusetts Open

See also

1994 Nike Tour graduates
2001 Buy.com Tour graduates
List of Florida Gators men's golfers on the PGA Tour
List of golfers with most Web.com Tour wins

References

External links

American male golfers
Florida Gators men's golfers
PGA Tour golfers
Korn Ferry Tour graduates
Central Oklahoma Bronchos men's golf coaches
Golfers from St. Louis
1969 births
Living people